Jose Julio Cabanillas Serrano (born 1958) is a Spanish poet. He was born in Granada. He has a degree in history and has written significant works in Spain, including Las canciones del alba(1990), Palabras de demora (1994), En lugar del mundo (1998) and Los que devuelve el mar (2005).

"Tan verdad como que los gallos pian y las pollos cacarean" J.J.Cabanillas

"Eso es así desde que Matusalén se afeitó la barba" J.J.Cabanillas

"Lo mismo los langostinos saben física cuántica, pero si no nos lo dicen, pues no lo sabemos" J.J.Cabanillas

References

1958 births
Living people
Spanish poets
Spanish male poets